David Belam (born 7 January 1968) is a British cross-country skier. He competed at the 1992 Winter Olympics and the 1994 Winter Olympics.

References

External links
 

1968 births
Living people
British male cross-country skiers
Olympic cross-country skiers of Great Britain
Cross-country skiers at the 1992 Winter Olympics
Cross-country skiers at the 1994 Winter Olympics
People from Brighton and Hove